Beit El'azari (lit. House of El'azari) is a moshav in central Israel. Located three miles south of the city of Rehovot, it falls under the jurisdiction of Brenner Regional Council.

History
It was founded in 1948 by Jewish immigrants from eastern Europe, on the site of the depopulated Palestinian village of al-Maghar.  Initially named Arugot, it was later renamed Ekron HaHadasha (lit. New Ekron), and finally Beit El'azari in memory of the agronomist Yitzhak El'azari-Volcani, founder of modern agriculture in Israel.

Notable residents
Avraham Zilberberg, MK

See also
Agricultural research in Israel
Benjamin Elazari Volcani

References

External links
Moshav website 

Moshavim
Populated places established in 1948
Populated places in Central District (Israel)
1948 establishments in Israel